Roy's Motel and Café is a motel, café, gas station and auto repair shop, defunct for many years but now being largely restored, on the National Trails Highway of U.S. Route 66 in the Mojave Desert town of Amboy in San Bernardino County, California. The historic site is an example of roadside Mid-Century Modern Googie architecture. The entire town of Amboy – including the mostly defunct Roy's complex – is owned by and under the stewardship of a private preservationist.

History

As a Route 66 stop 
In 1938, founder Roy Crowl opened Roy's as a gas and service station along U.S. Highway 66, in Amboy. At the time, Route 66 – the "Main Street of America" – was the primary east-west highway artery crossing the nation from Chicago through the Southwest to Los Angeles. The construction of Roy's was one consequence of a Route 66 realignment through Mountain Springs Summit, bypassing Goffs to directly connect Needles and Essex, and continuing west to Amboy.

In the 1940s, Crowl teamed up with his son-in-law, Herman "Buster" Burris. They expanded the business to include a café, an auto repair garage, and an auto court of small cabins for overnight rental by Route 66 travelers. Buster Burris himself almost singlehandedly created the town's infrastructure, some of which remains semi-functioning today. Burris even brought power to Amboy and Roy's all the way from Barstow by erecting his own poles and wires alongside Route 66 using an old Studebaker pickup truck.

Postwar business boomed as families discovered the joys of motor travel after the World War II years of tire and gasoline rationing and new cars not being manufactured.  During that time, Roy Crowl and Burris kept Roy's Garage and Café operating 24hrs – seven days a week; so busy was Roy's that Burris took out classified ads in newspapers across the country in the hope of recruiting help.

By the beginning of the 1950s, Roy's complex employed up to 70 people; the town's entire population then was 700.

Some very significant aesthetic changes came to Roy's Motel and Café in 1959: the February 1 erection of the towering neon boomerang sign visible for miles approaching Amboy; and the construction of the motel's new Mid-Century modern "inclined roof flying over a glassed wedge" guest reception and office theme building. These became a vital milepost beacon and modernist refuge for more than a decade.

After Interstate 40 
The 1972 opening of Interstate 40 in California, unconnected as well as a fair distance north of Amboy's section of Route 66, quite literally meant the overnight loss of business. Burris himself was quoted as saying that his business "went down to zero" the day I-40 opened. Roy Crowl died in 1977, with Buster Burris continuing the business for what comparatively few travelers now used decommissioned but scenic Route 66. Burris was known to have strong prejudices against "rowdy bikers and men with long hair" and chased off many "unacceptable patrons" at gunpoint.

During Amboy's decline, Roy's Motel and Café became the town's only business besides a post office and Bristol Dry Lake's chloride works, and continued to attract visitors including some well-known people, long after the town's overall decline.

Timothy White period 

In 1995 Timothy White leased the entire town of Amboy and Roy's from Buster Burris. White was a noted New York photographer, who saw value in maintaining the property in a weathered, worn condition as a filming location. White contracted with his 'high school buddy' Walt Wilson to manage the property, and later completed the purchase of the whole town in February, 2000 for U.S.$710,000 from Burris.  Buster Burris died later that year at age 91 on August 10, 2000.

Wilson and White continued to sell gasoline, food, and Route 66 souvenirs at Roy's. However the operating hours were sporadic, the menu limited, the management reportedly surly to visitors, and the gasoline and water almost prohibitively expensive – due to the facility's remote location and exorbitant pricing. Reportedly a single glass of tap water in the café cost US$1.00. Timothy White offered Amboy for sale on eBay in 2003, but the property remained unsold.

Restoration
The property went into foreclosure for repossession in February 2005, with Timothy White and Walt Wilson relinquishing control and returning ownership of Amboy and Roy's to Bessie Burris, Buster Burris's widow. She offered all the property for sale "on the San Bernardino County courthouse steps" but no bidders showed up. With her granddaughter Bonnie Barnes helping, Bessie Burris declared the town on the market for just one March 2005 week with sale to the highest bidder that Friday at noon.

The town was finally sold in May 2005, to Southern California preservation patron Albert Okura, after his pledge to Bessie Burris to restore Roy's keeping its original historic Route 66 look and feel, reopen it, and to open a new museum showcasing Amboy's history.  Okura acquired the 950+/- acres including the town and Roy's Motel and Café for $425,000 in cash on May 3, 2005.

Albert Okura, owner of the Juan Pollo chain restaurants, faced challenges in getting basics such as electricity and water services restored and operative. Okura's restoration hurdles predominantly involved Amboy's infrastructure, most of which had been laid by Buster Burris himself and not to current building codes. Bessie Burris continued to visit and work with Albert Okura collecting memorabilia for the town and Roy's until her death at 91, May 17, 2008 in nearby Wonder Valley, California.

Okura has experience with preservationist efforts and stewardship, being the owner of the Original McDonald's in San Bernardino, California which he operates as a museum. Unlike Wilson and White who wanted to maintain Roy's and Amboy in a "weathered" condition for use as in film shoots, Okura plans to fully restore Roy's to its former glory as a "nostalgia tourist" destination, and Route 66 rest stop for travelers en route to and from Colorado River scenic and recreation areas.

Reopening 
The first steps, the coffee shop and gas station, have both been refurbished and were reopened on April 28, 2008. The Roy's Motel and Café repair, renovation, and restoration costs so far approached U.S.$100,000. While the station's gasoline is still expensive, owing to remote delivery costs, it is below the exorbitant Wilson and White years. Albert Okura also has plans to open a Roy's Café and mini-mart at the same location, although the lack of adequate potable water supplies has kept the café's kitchen closed.

A 2013 Kickstarter campaign proposed to restore the Roy's neon sign as part of a larger project by which a newly established Amboy Foundation of Art proposes to eventually rehabilitate the long-abandoned motel as a place in the desert where artists would be able to achieve solitude and inspiration.

The motel is now closed, though it has been used as a staging ground for art exhibits.

In popular culture 
Actors Harrison Ford and Anthony Hopkins, with autographed photos on the restaurant's wall, visited when schedules allowed. Ford frequently flew in, landing his plane on the adjacent Amboy Airfield, one of the first in California.

Part of the 1986 motion picture The Hitcher with Rutger Hauer was filmed in The Roy's Gas Bar. Both the reception area and neon sign helped establish the setting for a 1999 television commercial for Qwest Communications. It was also used in the Enrique Iglesias music video for his hit single, Hero. In September 1993, Kalifornia was released, starring Brad Pitt, which was filmed in Amboy.

In 1978, Buster Burris married Bessie Van deVeer, a local artist, who brought her love of the desert and her charm to Amboy. Roses were painted on side of the prep table in the kitchen and can be seen in the movie The Hitcher. They continued to run the town together until 1995.

The music video for Rock band Queens of the Stone Age's 2000 hit, "The Lost Art of Keeping a Secret," features Roy's prominently. The band themselves are natives of the California desert.

Roy's was described fondly as a place which Neil Peart, Rush's drummer, would stay on his motorcycle journey in his book Ghost Rider.

In 2008 it was used as the background of Sky idents of "Twister".

Beneath the Dark, a 2010 American mystery-thriller film directed by Chad Feehan and starring Josh Stewart, Jamie-Lynn Sigler, and Chris Browning, was filmed primarily at Roy's.

The 2010 racing video game Blur featured Roy's as part of a level set in Amboy.

In 2013, Armin Van Buuren filmed portions of his music video for his song, "This Is What It Feels Like" in Amboy.

Also in 2013, producer Thomas Wise filmed a national TV commercial for Lucas Oil Products & Lucas Oil Stabilizer at Roy's Motel and Cafe, along with various other unique southern California locations.

Part of the 2015 motion picture Southbound was filmed at Roy's Motel and Café. It is featured prominently in the first story, “The Way Out.” The location returns briefly in the final story, “The Way In.”
A painting of the famous Roy's sign by Bob Dylan is currently being exhibited as part of 180 pieces of his in Miami.

The café was a featured stop during Japanese rickshaw driver Yuji Suzuki's 2019 attempt at running the length of Route 66.

A 2022 Nissan commercial, seen during the NCAA men's and women's basketball tournaments, featuring various collegiate mascots, was filmed at and near the motel.

In 2022 Olivia Rodrigo performed the song Traitor from her debut album Sour in this location for the documentary Olivia Rodrigo: driving home 2 u.

See also

Amboy Crater
California Route 66 Museum – Victorville, California
 List of motels

References

External links

Roy's: history, photos and various external links website
Takemytrip.com: Description and history of Roy's
 Qwest Communications commercial filmed at Roy's
California Historic Route 66 Association website
Lucas Oil spot filmed at Roy’s by Thomas Wise, 2013
https://www.imdb.com/title/tt1422800/ Beneath The Dark 2010]

Buildings and structures on U.S. Route 66
History of the Mojave Desert region
Tourist attractions along U.S. Route 66
Restaurants in California
History of California
Hotels established in 1938
Hotels in California
Buildings and structures in San Bernardino County, California
Modernist architecture in California
Tourist attractions in San Bernardino County, California
Retail buildings in California
Buildings and structures on the National Register of Historic Places in California
Gas stations on the National Register of Historic Places in California
Motels in the United States
National Register of Historic Places in San Bernardino County, California
Restaurants on the National Register of Historic Places
Transportation buildings and structures in San Bernardino County, California
1938 establishments in California